Bandar Seri Jempol or Bandar Baru Serting is a town and planned capital of Jempol District, Negeri Sembilan, Malaysia.

Facilities

Jempol District Mosque
Jempol District and Land Office
Jempol Municipal Council (MPJL) main headquarters
Jempol District Hospital
Jempol Police District Headquarters (IPD Jempol)
Jempol Public Library 

Jempol District
Towns in Negeri Sembilan